Ephraim Zehavi was an Israeli engineer received  B.Sc. and  M.Sc. degrees in Electrical Engineering from the Israel Institute of  Technology (Technion), in Haifa, Israel, in 1977 and 1981, respectively, and a Ph.D.  degree in Electrical Engineering from the University of Massachusetts, Amherst in 1986.

Life 
In 1985 he joined QUALCOMM Incorporated, San Diego, CA, where he was involved in the design and development of satellite communication systems, and VLSI design of Viterbi decoder chips. From 1988 to 1992 he was a faculty member at the Department of Electrical Engineering, Technion-Israel Institute of Technology and also was a consultant for Qualcomm on CDMA technology. In 1992 he rejoined QUALCOMM Incorporated, San Diego. California as a Principal Engineer, where he was involved in the design of PCS CDMA systems. In 1994 he became a VP of Technology and a Project Engineer of the Globalstar system. In 1994, Upon his return to Israel  Zehavi received the title of Assistant General Manager, Engineering in Qualcomm Israel, Ltd, and later become the GM of Qualcomm Israel.  In 1998, Dr. Zehavi initiated a new startup in the area of WLAN, which later was named Mobilian. Mobilian was sold to Intel in 2003. At the end of 2003, he joined the Faculty of Engineering at Bar Ilan University,  where he is now the Dean of the faculty of  Engineering. Prof.  Zehavi is the co-recipient of the 1994 IEEE Stephen 0. Rice Award and holds more than 40 patents in the areas of coding, CDMA technology, WLAN, and coexistence of multiple wireless networks. His main research interests include wireless communications, coding technology, and application of game theory for communication systems. He was named Fellow of the Institute of Electrical and Electronics Engineers (IEEE) in 2013 for contributions to pragmatic coding and bit interleaving.

References 

Fellow Members of the IEEE
Living people
Year of birth missing (living people)